NGC 3877 is a type Sc spiral galaxy that was discovered by William Herschel on February 5, 1788.  It is located below the magnitude 3.7 star Chi Ursae Majoris in Ursa Major.

Supernova
The Type IIn supernova SN 1998S is the only supernova that has been observed within NGC 3877.

Environment
NGC 3877 is a member of the M109 Group, a group of galaxies located in the constellation Ursa Major that may contain over 50 galaxies.  The brightest galaxy in the group is the spiral galaxy M109.

References

External links

 

Spiral galaxies
M109 Group
Ursa Major (constellation)
3877
06745
036699
17880205